Acacia microcybe is a shrub of the genus Acacia and the subgenus Plurinerves that is endemic to an area of north eastern Australia where it is listed as being of Least Concern according to the Nature Conservation Act 1992.

Description
Like most species of Acacia it has phyllodes rather than true leaves.

Taxonomy
The species was first formally described by the botanist Leslie Pedley in 1978 as Acacia microcephala and then reclassified as Racosperma microcephalum in 1987. It was classified under the current name by Pedley in 2006 as a part of the work Notes on Acacia Mill. (Leguminosae: Mimosoideae), chiefly from Queensland as published in the journal Austrobaileya.

Distribution
The plant has a limited distribution in North West Queensland to the north and north west of Aramac growing in alkaline, hard, stony, clay soils.

See also
List of Acacia species

References

microcybe
Flora of Queensland
Taxa named by Leslie Pedley
Plants described in 2006